Wanted: Live at Turkey Trot is a concert video and an album by the American country rock band the New Riders of the Purple Sage.  It was recorded in 2006 at Turkey Trot Acres, a hunting lodge in Candor, New York.  It was released in 2007 as a DVD packaged together with a CD.

Wanted: Live at Turkey Trot was the first album of new recordings released by the New Riders after the band re-formed in 2005.  It features David Nelson and Buddy Cage, from the "classic" early 1970s lineup, along with then-new band members Michael Falzarano, Ronnie Penque, and Johnny Markowski.

Track listing
"Lonesome L.A. Cowboy" (Peter Rowan) – 5:08
"Sutter's Mill" (John Dawson) – 3:25
"Watcha Gonna Do" (Dawson) – 2:59
"Last Lonely Eagle" (Dawson) – 5:59
"Rainbow" (Dawson) – 3:59
"Portland Woman" (Dawson) – 12:04
"One Too Many Stories" (Dawson) – 5:14
"Henry" (Dawson) – 4:51
"Sliding Delta" (Mississippi John Hurt) – 4:22
"Lochinvar" (Dawson) – 4:30
"Garden of Eden" (Dawson) – 16:25
"I Don't Know You" (Dawson) – 3:53
"Panama Red" (Rowan) – 3:47

Personnel

New Riders of the Purple Sage
David Nelson – lead guitar, vocals
Buddy Cage – pedal steel guitar
Michael Falzarano – guitar, vocals
Ronnie Penque – bass, vocals
Johnny Markowski – drums, vocals

Production
Video produced, directed, and edited by Michael A. Fitch
Audio produced by Michael Falzarano
Live recording engineer Jeff Stachyra, assisted by Todd McCarthy
Mixed by Michael Falzarano and Jon Marshall Smith
Still photos and cover design by Daniel T. Cole - Rexford NY.
Panama Red art by Lore
Smoke signals by Michael Ferguson and Kelly

References

Hittin' the Note newsletter, March 2008
Wanted: Live at Turkey Trot on the Grateful Dead Family Discography
Wanted: Live at Turkey Trot on StumbleAudio

New Riders of the Purple Sage live albums
2007 video albums
Live video albums
2007 live albums